Giffard West is a town in Victoria, Australia. It is located 29 km south of Sale.

History
The Giffard West Hall was opened on 18 December 1918 by Thomas Livingston MLA. Energy company Solis RE has proposed the construction of the Gippsland Renewable Energy Park in Giffard West, which would be Victoria's largest solar farm if built.

Demographics
The median age of persons in Giffard West was 54 years. There were slightly more females than males, with 50.8% of the population female and 49.2% male. The average household size was 2.3 people per household.

References

Towns in Victoria (Australia)
Shire of Wellington